City of Lei Tabor is a 1980 fantasy role-playing game supplement published by Judges Guild for RuneQuest.

Contents
City of Lei Tabor is a supplement that describes a city state.

Reception
Forrest Johnson reviewed City of Lei Tabor in The Space Gamer No. 32. Johnson commented that "Unless you are rich or hard up for a RuneQuest city, this supplement is not worth [the price]."

William Fawcett reviewed City of Lei Tabor in The Dragon #44.  Fawcett commented that "There is really little to add in describing this module other than to observe that what it does — present interesting characters for the players to interact with — it does well."

Anders Swenson reviewed City of Lei Tabor for Different Worlds magazine and stated that "Lei Tabor could be transplanted into any world to be the 'town' from which most adventures start. With the publication of this book, many RQ referees will never have to w rite out an NPC soldier again, ever. This book should be in the library of all ambitious RQ players."

References

Judges Guild RuneQuest adventures
Role-playing game supplements introduced in 1980
RuneQuest 2nd edition supplements